Durham Sixth Form Centre is a mixed sixth form located in Durham, County Durham, England.

It is a community sixth form provision administered by Durham County Council. The centre is located in Durham city centre, but enrols students from across County Durham, Sunderland and into Northumberland.

Durham Sixth Form Centre offers a range of A-levels and BTECs as programmes of study for students.

Notable alumni
Matt Baker, television presenter
Steph Houghton, professional footballer
Connor Lawson, star of CBBC's The Dumping Ground
Michael Adams, CBBC television presenter

References

External links
Durham Sixth Form Centre official website

Education in County Durham
Community schools in County Durham
Schools in Durham, England